Raakuyil is a 1973 Indian Malayalam film, directed by P. Vijayan and produced by P. Bhaskaran. The film stars Adoor Bhasi, Jose Prakash, Sankaradi and Adoor Pankajam in the lead roles. The film had musical score by Pukazhenthi.

Cast 

Adoor Bhasi
Jose Prakash
Sankaradi
Adoor Pankajam
Bahadoor
Chandraji
Paravoor Bharathan
Philomina
Sudheer
Sujatha
T. K. Balachandran
Veeran

Soundtrack 
The music was composed by Pukazhenthi and the lyrics were written by P. Bhaskaran.

References

External links 
 

1973 films
1970s Malayalam-language films
Films scored by Pukazhenthi